Topology was a peer-reviewed mathematical journal covering topology and geometry. It was established in 1962 and was published by Elsevier. The last issue of Topology appeared in 2009.

Pricing dispute 
On 10 August 2006, after months of unsuccessful negotiations with Elsevier about the price policy of library subscriptions, the entire editorial board of the journal handed in their resignation, effective 31 December 2006. Subsequently, two more issues appeared in 2007 with papers that had been accepted before the resignation of the editors. In early January the former editors instructed Elsevier to remove their names from the website of the journal, but Elsevier refused to comply, justifying their decision by saying that the editorial board should remain on the journal until all of the papers accepted during its tenure had been published.

In 2007 the former editors  of Topology announced the launch of the Journal of Topology, published by Oxford University Press on behalf of the London Mathematical Society at a significantly lower price. Its first issue appeared in January 2008.

References

External links 
 
 Journals declaring independence

Mathematics journals
English-language journals
Publications established in 1962
Elsevier academic journals
Publications disestablished in 2009
Bimonthly journals
Defunct journals